Irvin Salinas (born December 8, 1988), known professionally as Pee Wee, is an American singer, songwriter, dancer, and actor. He was a former singer for the band Kumbia Kings and was a lead singer for Kumbia All Starz, both created by A.B. Quintanilla. In early 2008, he left Kumbia All Starz to become a solo artist. His debut studio album Yo Soy was released on August 11, 2009.

Early life and career

Early life and discovery (1988–2003)
Irvin Salinas, known as Pee Wee, was born on December 8, 1988, in Othello, Washington to a Mexican-American family. He is the youngest of three siblings (his older sister named Elizabeth Salinas and his older brother Simon Salinas). His mother, María Martínez, changed residence to La Joya, Texas, located 18 miles west of McAllen, Texas. Irvin began to wash cars, wash dishes  and perform other small jobs in order to provide his family with extra income. At thirteen, he met A.B. Quintanilla, brother of Selena, in a casting at Pee Wee's middle school. It was then that A.B. Quintanilla expressed interest in Pee Wee, and informed him about a casting for a music video with his band and offered him an audition. Irvin accepted, presenting to him a few days later in the casting. He also went to Memorial Middle School and La Joya High School.

Kumbia Kings (2003–06)
His artistic career began in 2003 when he joined A.B. Quintanilla's band Kumbia Kings after several members like Frankie J and DJ Kane left Kumbia Kings. In 2004, he recorded his first song and video with Kumbia Kings, "Sabes a Chocolate" on the album Los Remixes 2.0, released on April 6, 2004. Following the record's success, Quintanilla decided the absolute stay of Irvin, and nicknamed him "Pee Wee" for being the only minor in the band, at the time. It was on the album Fuego, released on October 5, 2004, that included "Na Na Na (Dulce Niña)."

On April 7, 2005, Pee Wee along with A.B. Quintanilla and the rest of the Kumbia Kings participated in Selena ¡VIVE!, the tribute concert for Selena, A.B. Quintanilla's sister, performing "Baila Esta Kumbia". Kumbia Kings later released the album Duetos on March 29, 2005, which included "Baila Esta Kumbia".

Kumbia Kings released their live album Kumbia Kings Live on April 4, 2006, which included the single "Pachuco". They won a Latin Grammy for the album Kumbia Kings Live.

Later, in August 2006, a legal disagreement between A.B. Quintanilla and Cruz Martínez, the co-producer of the band, resulted in A.B. Quintanilla leaving Kumbia Kings. Other members started to leave including Pee Wee who left Kumbia Kings after Cruz Martínez replaced him with Jo-Joe because he didn't show up for a concert. Pee Wee continued with A.B. Quintanilla and Chris Pérez (brother-in-law of Quintanilla), joining him in his following project that would be the band Kumbia All Starz.

Kumbia All Starz (2006–08)
In August 2006, Pee Wee became the lead singer for A.B. Quintanilla's new band Kumbia All Starz. Kumbia All Starz launched their single "Chiquilla" on September 19, 2006. The band released their debut album Ayer Fue Kumbia Kings, Hoy Es Kumbia All Starz on October 3, 2006. They also launched other singles in 2007, "Parece Que Va a Llover", "Speedy Gonzales", and "Mami/Anoche No Dormí". However, on February 1, 2008, it was announced that Pee Wee had left the band to begin a career as solo singer a month before the band's second album Planeta Kumbia was released. It is speculated that the leave was also attributed to mistreatment from A.B. Quintanilla, but was not confirmed.

Solo, Bust a Ritmo, El Show de los Sueños, Camaleones and Yo Soy (2008–11)
After he left the band Kumbia All Starz, Cruz Martínez invited Pee Wee to be a part of his band Los Super Reyes, but Pee Wee declined the invitation to pursue a career as solo artist. He collaborated with Erre XI on the song "Carita Bonita", released on February 19, 2008.

On June 16, 2008, he became the host of the series Bust a Ritmo on MTV Tr3s.

On July 17, 2008, Pee Wee made his debut as a solo artist in 2008 Premios Juventud performing "Life Is a Dance Floor". In September 2008, Pee Wee was invited by Rubén and Santiago Galindo to take part in the reality show El Show de los Sueños, production of Televisa, in the first season of El Show de los Sueños: Sangre de Mi Sangre where he competed with artists such as Gloria Trevi, Edith Márquez, Ernesto D'Alessio and Kalimba, along with Susana Fuente and Adriana Fuente, the Fuentes.

On October 27, 2008, Pee Wee and his team defeated Gloria Trevi and Kalimba in the final of El Show de los Sueños and gaining the right to take part in Los Reyes del Show. In A Telethon in 2008, Pee Wee declared that he was officially a Mexican citizen.
He collaborated with other singers like RBD members Christopher Uckermann and Dulce María. On El Show de los Sueños he debuted a new song titled "Quédate" with La Nueva Banda Timbiriche.

In November 2008, Pee Wee opened the concerts for RBD during the Gira Del Adios World Tour in Brazil except for the two extra shows.

December 7, 2008, was the beginning of Los Reyes del Show where Pee Wee managed to make it to the finale of the program on December 14, 2008, where he again managed to win and defeat Gloria Trevi and Kalimba, gaining US$1,000,000.00. The money was distributed in US$333,333.00 between the 3 members of the team.

On March 26, 2009, Flex and Pee Wee sang together in Premios Lo Nuestro 2009 singing "Dime Si Te Vas Con Él". On May 29, 2009, he released his new single "Cumbayá". "Cumbayá" was released worldwide on June 1, 2009. "Cumbayá" was released on June 30, 2009, on iTunes. On July 5, performed the hit single "Carita Bonita" and a new single called "Tan Feliz" featuring two new Puerto Rican reggaeton singers Dyland & Lenny in Premios Tecate Deportes 2009. On July 16, 2009, Pee Wee performed for the first time, his new single "Cumbayá" in 2009 Premios Juventud. On July 27, 2009, the telenovela Camaleones premiered in Mexico in which Pee Wee stars as Ulises Morán.

On August 11, 2009, his debut studio album Yo Soy was released. On August 12, was scheduled to perform on Premios Texas 2010 from Austin, Texas. He was nominated for Best Male Artist.

Name change and second studio album (2011–present)
In 2011, Pee Wee changed his name to PW. He signed with Top Stop Music, a record label that features artists such as Prince Royce and Luis Enrique. His debut single as "PW", "Wanna Be Yours", was released on September 27, 2011. The dance track was produced by Sergio George and French producers So Fly and Nius. The video was shot at Universal Studios. His new album was released in February 2012.

Discography

Studio albums

EP

Singles

As main artist

As featured artist

Promotional singles

Other appearances

Filmography

Videography

Music videos

Guest music videos

References

External links
 
 Pee Wee on YouTube
 
 
 Biography (Spanish): Univision: Biografia de Pee Wee
 Camaleones Fan Blog
 Pee Wee @ Acceso Total

 
1988 births
21st-century American singers
American child singers
American expatriates in Mexico
American male dancers
American male pop singers
American male singer-songwriters
American male telenovela actors
American people of Mexican descent
Capitol Latin artists
Cumbia musicians
EMI Televisa Music artists
Hispanic and Latino American male actors
Hispanic and Latino American musicians
Kumbia All Starz members
Kumbia Kings members
Latin pop singers
Living people
Male actors from Texas
Singer-songwriters from Texas
Naturalized citizens of Mexico
People from Othello, Washington
People from McAllen, Texas
Sony Music Latin artists
Spanish-language singers of the United States
Top Stop Music artists
Singer-songwriters from Washington (state)